Brownea leucantha, called roso blanco, is a species of flowering plant in the genus Brownea, native to Peru and Venezuela. It is the emblematic state tree of Miranda, Venezuela. It can be distinguished from other members of its genus by its white flowers.

References

leucantha
Plants described in 1800